Dalmatian or Dalmatic (or simply ;) was a Romance language that was spoken in the Dalmatia region of present-day Croatia, and as far south as Kotor in Montenegro. The name refers to a tribe of the Illyrian linguistic group, Dalmatae. The Ragusan dialect of Dalmatian, the most studied prestige dialect, was the official language of the Republic of Ragusa for much of its medieval history until it was gradually supplanted by other local languages.

Dalmatian speakers lived in the coastal towns of Zadar, Trogir, Spalato (Split), Ragusa (Dubrovnik), and Kotor, each of these cities having a local dialect, and on the islands of Krk, Cres, and Rab.

Dialects
Almost every city developed its own dialect. Most of these became extinct before they were recorded, so the only trace of these ancient dialects is some words borrowed into local dialects of today's Croatia and Montenegro.

Ragusan dialect
Ragusan is the Southern dialect, whose name is derived from the Romance name of Dubrovnik, Ragusa. It came to the attention of modern scholars in two letters, from 1325 and 1397, and other mediaeval texts, which show a language influenced heavily by Venetian. The available sources include some 260 Ragusan words including  'bread',  'father',  'house', and  'to do', which were quoted by the Italian Filippo Diversi, the rector of the Ragusan grammar school in the 1430s.

The Maritime Republic of Ragusa had a large and important fleet, by the 15th century numbering about 300 ships. Nevertheless, during the 16th century, the Ragusan Romance language fell out of use and became extinct.

Vegliot dialect
Vegliot or Vegliote (the native name being ) is the Northern dialect. Its name is derived from the Italian name of Krk, an island in the Kvarner Gulf, called Vikla in Vegliot. The Croatian name derives from the Roman name, whereas the younger name  (meaning ) was created in the mediaeval Romanesque period.

History

Dalmatian evolved from the vulgar Latin of the Illyro-Romans. It was spoken on the Dalmatian coast from Fiume (now Rijeka) as far south as Cattaro (Kotor) in Montenegro. Speakers lived mainly in the coastal towns of Jadera (Zadar), Tragurium (Trogir), Spalatum (Split), Ragusa (Dubrovnik) and Acruvium (Kotor), and also on the islands of Curicta (Krk), Crepsa (Cres) and Arba (Rab). Almost every city developed its own dialect, but the most important dialects that are known of were Vegliot, a northern dialect spoken on the island of Curicta, and Ragusan, a southern dialect spoken in and around Ragusa (Dubrovnik).

The oldest preserved documents written in Dalmatian are 13th century inventories in Ragusa (Dubrovnik). Dalmatian is also known from two Ragusan letters, dated 1325 and 1397. The available sources include roughly 260 Ragusan words. Surviving words include  'bread',  'father',  'house', and  'to do', which were quoted by the Dalmatian Filippo Diversi, Rector of the republic of Ragusa in the 1430s. The earliest reference to the Dalmatian language dates from the tenth century and it has been estimated that about 50,000 people spoke it at that time. After the loss of Ragusa, Dalmatian was no longer the language of any urban center, and it developed no written tradition. Udaina's Vegliote is considerably influenced by Venetian, which was in fact his native language—his "Vegliote" was in fact his recollection of the language he had once spoken with his long-deceased grandmother, and had grown up hearing his parents speaking.

Dalmatian was influenced particularly heavily by Venetian and Croatian (despite the latter, the Latin roots of Dalmatian remained prominent). A 14th-century letter from Zadar (origin of the Iadera dialect) shows strong influence from Venetian, the language that after years under Venetian rule superseded Iadera and other dialects of Dalmatian. Other dialects met their demise with the settlement of populations of Slavic speakers.

Extinction

In 1897, the scholar Matteo Bartoli, himself a native of nearby Istria, visited Tuone Udaina, the last speaker of any Dalmatian dialect, to study his language, writing down approximately 2,800 words, stories, and accounts of his life, which were published in a book that has provided much information on the vocabulary, phonology, and grammar of the language. Bartoli wrote in Italian and published a translation in German (Das Dalmatische) in 1906. The Italian language manuscripts were reportedly lost, and the work was not re-translated into Italian until 2001.

Just one year later, on 10 June 1898, Tuone Udaina was accidentally killed at 74 in a roadwork explosion.

Classification
In the most recent classification from 2017 it was classified by the Max Planck Institute for the Science of Human History with the Istriot language in the Dalmatian Romance subgroup.

It was once thought to be a language that bridged the gap between Romanian and Italian, but it was only distantly related to the nearby Romanian dialects, such as the nearly extinct Istro-Romanian spoken in nearby Istria, Croatia.

Some of its features are quite archaic. Dalmatian is the only Romance language that has palatalised  and  before , but not before  (all the others have palatalised them in both situations, except Sardinian, which has not palatalised them at all):  > Vegliot: ,  > Vegliot: .

Some Dalmatian words have been preserved as borrowings in South Slavic languages, in Chakavian and the Dubrovnik dialect of Shtokavian.

Similarities to Balkan Romance languages
In certain cases Balkan Romance and Dalmatian show sound changes in common that are otherwise rare in Romance, which may be suggestive of particular genetic links between the former. The below table also shows two conservative features: retention of Latin /pt/ and /mn/.

There are also some Latin words that Balkan Romance and Dalmatian both inherited that are otherwise rare elsewhere in Romance, at least in their original sense. For example  (white), basalca (church) and inteliguar (understand) correspond to the Romanian alb, biserică and înțelege; meanwhile, Italian has bianco, chiesa and capire.

Vlachs/Morlachs from Dalmatia and their language
Vlachs (Aromanians) from Herzegovina and Dalmatia were known as "Caravlachs" during Turkish occupation. "Cara" means black in Turkish and North in Turkish geography. Translated into Greek, the name became Morlachs (from Mauro Vlachs). Vlachs or Morlachs spoke a language close to Romanian. Vlachs or Morlachs spread into all Dalmatian areas including Adriatic isles and towns. The majority were Slavicized and many of them were Islamized or Catholicized. Today there are only a dozen Morlachs in Croatia and they have lost their maternal Romance spoken language.

Grammar

An analytic trend can be observed in Dalmatian: nouns and adjectives began to lose their gender and number inflexions, the noun declension disappeared completely, and the verb conjugations began to follow the same path, but the verb maintained a person and number distinction except in the third person (in common with Romanian and several languages of Italy).

The definite article precedes the noun, unlike in the Eastern Romance languages like Romanian, which have it postposed to the noun.

Vocabulary
The Dalmatians retained an active urban society in their city-states, whereas most Romanians were driven into small mountain settlements during the Great Migrations of 400 to 800 AD.

Venetian became a major influence on the language as Venetian commercial influence grew. The Chakavian dialect and Dubrovnik Shtokavian dialect of Croatian, which were spoken outside the cities since the immigration of the Slavs, gained importance in the cities by the 16th century, and it eventually replaced Dalmatian as the day-to-day language. Nevertheless, some words were loaned into coastal Croatian varieties: 
 Dubrovnik: CL antemna > otijemna "sail pole"; columna > kelomna "pillar, column"; ficatum > pìkat "liver"; lucerna > lùk(i)jerna "oil lamp"; lixivum > lìksija "lye"; oculata > úkljata "black-tail sparus, Sparus melanurus"; recessa > rèkesa "ebb tide";
 Standard Croatian: arbor(em) > jȃrbor, jarbol (Slovenian jambor) "mast"; aurata > òvrata, obrata "gilt-head bream"; canaba > kònoba "(wine) cellar, cellar bar"; lolligo, -inem > òliganj, lȉganj, lȉgnja "squid"; margo, -inem > mr̀gin(j), mrganj "furrow or ditch marking a border"; tracta > trakta "dragnet, trawl", etc.

Swadesh list

Literature

As Dalmatian was mainly an oral language, there is not much literature preserved in it; only some fragments collected in a book by Antonio Ive and a few unpublished texts in archives still unknown to the public. But there are some works written in revived Dalmatian, as, for example, the short poetry book "Adi la raipa de mi jeuntut".

Sample

The following are examples of the Lord's Prayer in Latin, Dalmatian, Friulian, Italian, Istro-Romanian, Romanian, and Spanish:

Parable of the Prodigal Son
 

 English:

Song of Verzelot - Amura amure 
amura amure blai ke se prendaimo se no avaime rauba stentaraime se no avraime kuza ne kuzeta noi do furme la vaita benedata

ju aivenut de nuf in sta konstruta ju vila mur la puarta inseruta ruta. amura amure blai ke se prendaimo se no avaime rauba stentaraime se no avraime kuza ne kuzeta noi do furme la vaita benedata

E di la mundi sula balkonuta zio ke potaja favlur kola maja inamuruta ruta. amura amure blai ke se prendaimo se no avaime rauba stentaraime se no avraime kuza ne kuzeta noi do furme la vaita benedata

amura amure blai ke se prendaimo se no avaime rauba stentaraime se no avraime kuza ne kuzeta noi do furme la vaita benedata

Revitalization attempts 
Since the beginning of the 21st century, some enthusiasts have tried to revitalize Dalmatian (Vegliot dialect) through the net.

See also
Istriot language
Chakavian

References

Bibliography
 Bartoli, Matteo Giulio. (1906). Das Dalmatische: Altromanische Sprachreste von Veglia bis Ragusa und ihre Stellung in der Apennino-balkanischen Romania. 2 vols. Vienna: Kaiserliche Akademie der Wissenschaften.
 Italian translation: Il Dalmatico: Resti di un'antica lingua romanza parlata da Veglia a Ragusa e sua collocazione nella Romània appennino-balcanica. Trans. Aldo Duro. Rome: Istituto della Enciclopedia Italiana, 2000.
 Fisher, John. (1975). Lexical Affiliations of Vegliote. Rutherford: Fairleigh Dickinson University Press. .
 Hadlich, Roger L. (1965). The phonological history of Vegliote, Chapel Hill, University of North Carolina Press
 Maiden, Martin. “Dalmatian”, in The Oxford Guide to the Romance Languages, eds. Adam Ledgeway & Martin Maiden. Oxford: Oxford University Press, 2016, pp. 126–38.
 Price, Glanville. (2000). Encyclopedia of the Languages of Europe. Oxford, UK: Blackwell Publishers. .
 Ive, Antonio.  L' Antico dialetto di Veglia

External links

Dalmatian basic lexicon at the Global Lexicostatistical Database
 Dalmatian phrasebook - Wikitravel

 
Extinct Romance languages
Extinct languages of Europe
Languages extinct in the 1890s
Language revival